Katsiaryna Andrejeŭna Snytsina (born 2 September 1985) is a Kazakhstani-born Belarusian basketball player. She was part of the Belarusian teams that won a bronze medal at the 2007 European Championships and placed sixth at the 2008 Summer Olympics.

References

1985 births
Living people
Sportspeople from Oskemen
Kazakhstani emigrants to Belarus
Belarusian women's basketball players
Kazakhstani women's basketball players
Olympic basketball players of Belarus
Basketball players at the 2008 Summer Olympics
Basketball players at the 2016 Summer Olympics
Small forwards
Hatay Büyükşehir Belediyesi (women's basketball) players
Kazakhstani expatriate basketball people in France
Kazakhstani expatriate basketball people in Turkey
Belarusian expatriate basketball people in France
Belarusian expatriate basketball people in Turkey
Nesibe Aydın GSK players
Kazakhstani expatriate basketball people in Poland
Kazakhstani expatriate basketball people in Russia
Kazakhstani expatriate basketball people in Hungary
Belarusian expatriate basketball people in Poland
Belarusian expatriate basketball people in Russia
Belarusian expatriate basketball people in Hungary